Cheracebus is one of three genera of titi monkeys. Monkeys in this genus, particularly the type species Cheracebus lugens, are sometimes referred to as widow titi monkeys.

Historically, titis were monogeneric, comprising only the genus Callicebus Thomas, 1903. Owing to the great diversity found across titi monkey species, a new genus-level taxonomy was recently proposed that recognises three genera within the subfamily Callicebinae; Cheracebus Byrne et al., 2016 for the species of the torquatus group (Widow titis); Plecturocebus Byrne et al., 2016 for the Amazonian and Chaco titis of the moloch and donacophilus groups; and Callicebus Thomas, 1903 sensu stricto, for species of the Atlantic Forest personatus group.

Cheracebus is derived from the Latin chera (from the Greek χηρα) meaning widow and cebus (from the Greek kebos) meaning long tailed monkey.

Species
There are 5 species in this genus:
 Lucifer titi monkey, Cheracebus lucifer
 Black titi monkey, Cheracebus lugens
 Colombian black-handed titi monkey, Cheracebus medemi
 Red-headed titi monkey, Cheracebus regulus
 Collared titi monkey, Cheracebus torquatus

References

 
Primate genera
Taxa described in 2016